Exame Nacional do Ensino Médio, shortened as Enem is a non-mandatory, standardized Brazilian national exam, which evaluates high school students in Brazil. The ENEM is the most important exam of this kind in Brazil, with more than 8.6 million registered candidates in 2016. It is the second largest in the world after China's National Higher Education Entrance Examination.

After 2009 its importance for students who want to attend college has increased, since the exam has been used both as an admission test for enrollment in 23 federal universities and 26 educational institutes, as well as for certification for a high school degree. The test is also used by people desiring to gain points in the Universidade para Todos Program (or ProUni), a federal scholarship program.

Date and time

The ENEM is held in early November, with a small number of students taking the test in early December. The test starts at the same time across Brazil, with the starting time being based in Federal District. This results in the ENEM starting at four different times according to the local time zones, ranging from 10:30 am in the state of Acre to 1:30 pm in the Federal District and states of the South and Southeast regions.

The test 

Until 2008, the exam consisted of two parts: a 63 question multiple-choice test on various subjects (Portuguese, History, Geography, Math, Physics, Chemistry and Biology) and a composition.

Since 2009, the exam has been composed of 180 multiple-choice questions, equally divided into four areas of knowledge: languages, codes and related technologies (plus a written essay); human sciences and related technologies; natural sciences and related technologies; and mathematics and its technologies. Due to the length of the test, it is applied in two consecutive sundays, the first lasting 330 minutes, and the second lasting 300.

Even though its purpose is to be a national evaluation exam, students can use their scores to be admitted to a university, though not every university accepts it as the only admission exam. Usually private institutions, such as PUC-Rio, a major private Brazilian university, accept Enem as an admission exam. Others, such as University of São Paulo and Faculdade Cásper Líbero use the student's score as supplement to their admission credentials, depending on the student's performance.

Since 2009, most of Brazil's federal universities have used ENEM as part of their admission exams, either as the entirety of the exam, the first level, or as a way of selecting potential candidates.

2009 controversy

On October 1, 2009, it was announced that the test, which was supposed to take place on October 3 and 4, would be cancelled and postponed to another date within a 45-day period. The decision was made by the Brazilian Ministry of Education after the original test was offered for sale to a Brazilian newspaper O Estado de S. Paulo for R$ 500,000 (some US$278,000 at the time). After contacting the source, who stated that he obtained the test via a person from Inep (an institute of the Ministry of Education), the newspaper examined the exam and the minister of education, Fernando Haddad, confirmed the leak was of the official exam. At that time the Ministry of Education decided to move the exam to the beginning of December, in accordance with exam periods in universities. The decision was not implemented.

2021

In 2021, Jair Bolsonaro reportedly tried to have pro-government teachers in the elaboration of the exam. He also wanted to reference the Coup of 64 as a Revolution in the questions. In November 2021, 37 members from INEP resigned protesting against censorship.

See also
Vestibular
Instituto Nacional de Estudos e Pesquisas Educacionais Anísio Teixeira

University admissions in Brazil

References

External links
Official website 

Education policy in Brazil
Examinations
Standardized tests
1998 establishments in Brazil